ADSR may refer to:

ADSR envelope (attack decay sustain release), a common type of music envelope
 Accelerator-driven sub-critical reactor, a nuclear reactor using a particle accelerator to generate a fission reaction in a sub-critical assembly of fissionable material
 A.D.S.R. Musicwerks, a Seattle, Washington store and US record label that releases Synth Pop and Electro Industrial music
Attack Decay Sustain Release, the debut album from Simian Mobile Disco, released on June 18, 2007